Weddel is a railway station located in Weddel, Germany. The station is located on the Brunswick–Magdeburg railway and Weddel loop. The train services are operated by Metronom and Deutsche Bahn.

Train services
The station is served by the following services:

Regional services  Hildesheim - Braunschweig - Wolfsburg
Local services  Braunschweig - Helmstedt - Magdeburg - Burg

References

Railway stations in Lower Saxony